The 1987–88 Murray State Racers men's basketball team represented Murray State University during the 1987–88 NCAA Division I men's basketball season. The Racers, led by head coach Steve Newton, played their home games at Racer Arena in Murray, Kentucky as members of the Ohio Valley Conference. They finished the season 22–9, 13–1 in OVC play to win the OVC regular season championship. They defeated  to win the OVC tournament to advance to the NCAA tournament. As No. 14 seed in the Southeast region, the Racers defeated No. 3 seed NC State, 78–75, in the opening round before losing to eventual National champion Kansas, 61–58, in the round of 32.

Roster

Schedule and results

|-
!colspan=9 style=| Regular season

|-
!colspan=9 style=| Ohio Valley Conference tournament

|-
!colspan=9 style=| NCAA tournament

|-

Awards and honors
Jeff Martin – OVC Player of the Year
Steve Newton – OVC Coach of the Year

References

Murray State Racers men's basketball seasons
Murray State
Murray State
Murray State
Murray State